Vusumuzi is an African given name. Notable people with the name include:

Vusumuzi Masondo (born 1957), South African military commander
Vusumuzi Mazibuko (born 1984), South African cricketer 
Vuza Nyoni (Vusumuzi Nyoni, born 1984), Zimbabwean football player 

African given names